Cornetu is a commune in the south-west of Ilfov county, Muntenia, Romania. In Romanian, its name signifies a forest of European Cornel (Cornus mas) trees. It is composed of two villages, Buda and Cornetu.

References

Communes in Ilfov County
Localities in Muntenia